Josefina Mařáková, known as Pepa (19 March 1872, Vienna – 19 June 1907 Prague) was a Czech painter who specialized in caricatures and figure painting.

Biography 
She was born to the Czech landscape painter, Julius Mařák, during a period when he was working in Vienna, and originally spoke only German, although she took an early interest in her Czech heritage. In addition to her father, she received lessons from František Dvořák, Maximilian Pirner and Václav Brožík. 

Her first exhibition came in 1897 with the Fine Arts Union in Prague. She was, however, always in poor health and generally lived in seclusion with her mother. She also helped out in her father's studio and, after his death, briefly had one of her own. 

She was mainly devoted to creating figurative works in a decadent, Symbolist style, but also produced some portraits of notable personalities, including the painter, Otakar Lebeda, the politician František Ladislav Rieger, the family of poet Adolf Heyduk and her father's patron, Josef Hlávka.  

Much of her work is in private collections, but may also be seen at the National Gallery in Prague and the municipal gallery in Litomyšl.

Sources
 Veronika Hulíková, Pepa Mařák (1872?-1907), exhibition bulletin, National Gallery  
 Pavel Augusta. Kdo byl kdo v našich dějinách roku 1918, Libri, 1999.

External links 

 Brief biography @ Art+
 Photograph of Pepa with her father, Julius

1872 births
1907 deaths
Czech women painters
Symbolist painters
Artists from Vienna